The 32nd United States Congress was a meeting of the legislative branch of the United States federal government, consisting of the United States Senate and the United States House of Representatives. It met in Washington, D.C. from March 4, 1851, to March 4, 1853, during the last two years of Millard Fillmore's presidency. The apportionment of seats in the House of Representatives was based on the 1840 United States census. Both chambers had a Democratic majority.

It was one of the least active Congresses, forwarding only 74 bills that were signed by the president.

Major events 

 March 20, 1852: Uncle Tom's Cabin published.
 July 1, 1852: Henry Clay was the first to lie in state in the United States Capitol rotunda.
 November 2, 1852: 1852 United States presidential election: Democrat Franklin Pierce defeated Whig Winfield Scott.

Major legislation 

 March 2, 1853: An act providing for administering the oath of office to William R. King, Vice President elect of the United States of America. Sess. 2, Ch. 93,

Territories organized 

 March 2, 1853: Washington Territory was formed from Oregon Territory.

Party summary

Senate

House of Representatives

Leadership

Senate 
 President: Vacant (since the ascension of Millard Fillmore to U.S. President on July 9, 1850)
 President pro tempore: William R. King (D), until December 20, 1852
 David R. Atchison (D), from December 20, 1852

House of Representatives 
 Speaker: Linn Boyd (D)

Members 

This list is arranged by chamber, then by state. Senators are listed by class and representatives by district.

Senate
Senators were elected by the state legislatures every two years, with one-third beginning new six-year terms with each Congress. Preceding the names in the list below are Senate class numbers, which indicate the cycle of their election. In this Congress, Class 1 meant their term began with this Congress, facing re-election in 1856; Class 2 meant their term ended with this Congress, facing re-election in 1852; and Class 3 meant their term began in the last Congress, facing re-election in 1854.

Alabama 
 2. Jeremiah Clemens (D)
 3. William R. King (D), until December 20, 1852
 Benjamin Fitzpatrick (D), from January 14, 1853

Arkansas 
 2. William K. Sebastian (D)
 3. Solon Borland (D)

California 
 1. John B. Weller (D), from January 30, 1852
 3. William M. Gwin (D)

Connecticut 
 1. Isaac Toucey (D), from May 12, 1852
 3. Truman Smith (W)

Delaware 
 1. James A. Bayard Jr. (D)
 2. Presley Spruance (W)

Florida 
 1. Stephen Mallory (D)
 3. Jackson Morton (W)

Georgia 
 2. John M. Berrien (W), until May 28, 1852
 Robert M. Charlton (D), from May 31, 1852
 3. William C. Dawson (W)

Illinois 
 2. Stephen A. Douglas (D)
 3. James Shields (D)

Indiana 
 1. Jesse D. Bright (D)
 3. James Whitcomb (D), until October 4, 1852
 Charles W. Cathcart (D), from December 6, 1852, until January 18, 1853
 John Pettit (D), from January 18, 1853

Iowa 
 2. George W. Jones (D)
 3. Augustus C. Dodge (D)

Kentucky 
 2. Joseph R. Underwood (W)
 3. Henry Clay (W), until June 29, 1852
 David Meriwether (D), from July 6, 1852, until August 31, 1852
 Archibald Dixon (W), from September 1, 1852

Louisiana 
 2. Solomon W. Downs (D)
 3. Pierre Soulé (D)

Maine 
 1. Hannibal Hamlin (D)
 2. James W. Bradbury (D)

Maryland 
 1. Thomas Pratt (W)
 3. James Pearce (W)

Massachusetts 
 1. Charles Sumner (FS), from April 24, 1851
 2. John Davis (W)

Michigan 
 1. Lewis Cass (D)
 2. Alpheus Felch (D)

Mississippi 
 1. Jefferson Davis (D), until September 23, 1851
 John J. McRae (D), from December 1, 1851, until March 17, 1852
 Stephen Adams (D), from March 17, 1852
 2. Henry S. Foote (D), until January 8, 1852
 Walker Brooke (W), from February 18, 1852

Missouri 
 1. Henry S. Geyer (W)
 3. David R. Atchison (D)

New Hampshire 
 2. John P. Hale (FS)
 3. Moses Norris Jr. (D)

New Jersey 
 1. Robert F. Stockton (D), until January 1, 1853
 2. Jacob W. Miller (W)

New York 
 1. Hamilton Fish (W), from March 19, 1851
 3. William H. Seward (W)

North Carolina 
 2. Willie P. Mangum (W)
 3. George E. Badger (W)

Ohio 
 1. Benjamin Wade (W), from March 15, 1851
 3. Salmon P. Chase (FS)

Pennsylvania 
 1. Richard Brodhead (D)
 3. James Cooper (W)

Rhode Island 
 1. Charles T. James (D)
 2. John H. Clarke (W)

South Carolina 
 2. Robert Rhett (D), until May 7, 1852
 William F. De Saussure (D), from May 10, 1852
 3. Andrew Butler (D)

Tennessee 
 1. James C. Jones (W)
 2. John Bell (W)

Texas 
 1. Thomas J. Rusk (D)
 2. Sam Houston (D)

Vermont 
 1. Solomon Foot (W)
 3. William Upham (W), until January 14, 1853
 Samuel S. Phelps (W), from January 17, 1853

Virginia 
 1. James M. Mason (D)
 2. Robert M. T. Hunter (D)

Wisconsin 
 1. Henry Dodge (D)
 3. Isaac P. Walker (D)

House of Representatives
The names of members of the House of Representatives are preceded by their district numbers.

Alabama 
 . John Bragg (D)
 . James Abercrombie (W)
 . Sampson W. Harris (D)
 . William R. Smith (U)
 . George S. Houston (D)
 . Williamson R. W. Cobb (D)
 . Alexander White (W)

Arkansas 
 . Robert W. Johnson (D)

California 
Both representatives were elected statewide on a general ticket.
 . Edward C. Marshall (D)
 . Joseph W. McCorkle (D)

Connecticut 
 . Charles Chapman (W)
 . Colin M. Ingersoll (D)
 . Chauncey F. Cleveland (D)
 . Origen S. Seymour (D)

Delaware 
 . George Read Riddle (D)

Florida 
 . Edward C. Cabell (W)

Georgia 
 . Joseph W. Jackson (SR)
 . James Johnson (U)
 . David J. Bailey (SR)
 . Charles Murphey (U)
 . Elijah W. Chastain (U)
 . Junius Hillyer (U)
 . Alexander H. Stephens (U)
 . Robert A. Toombs (U)

Illinois 
 . William H. Bissell (D)
 . Willis Allen (D)
 . Orlando B. Ficklin (D)
 . Richard S. Molony (D)
 . William A. Richardson (D)
 . Thompson Campbell (D)
 . Richard Yates (W)

Indiana 
 . James Lockhart (D)
 . Cyrus L. Dunham (D)
 . John L. Robinson (D)
 . Samuel W. Parker (W)
 . Thomas A. Hendricks (D)
 . Willis A. Gorman (D)
 . John G. Davis (D)
 . Daniel Mace (D)
 . Graham N. Fitch (D)
 . Samuel Brenton (W)

Iowa 
 . Bernhart Henn (D)
 . Lincoln Clark (D)

Kentucky 
 . Linn Boyd (D)
 . Benjamin E. Grey (W)
 . Presley Ewing (W)
 . William T. Ward (W)
 . James W. Stone (D)
 . Addison White (W)
 . Humphrey Marshall (W), until August 4, 1852
 William Preston (W), from December 6, 1852
 . John C. Breckinridge (D)
 . John C. Mason (D)
 . Richard H. Stanton (D)

Louisiana 
 . Louis St. Martin (D)
 . J. Aristide Landry (W)
 . Alexander G. Penn (D)
 . John Moore (W)

Maine 
 . Moses MacDonald (D)
 . John Appleton (D)
 . Robert Goodenow (W)
 . Charles Andrews (D), until April 30, 1852
 Isaac Reed (W), from June 25, 1852
 . Ephraim K. Smart (D)
 . Israel Washburn Jr. (W)
 . Thomas J. D. Fuller (D)

Maryland 
 . Richard Bowie (W)
 . William T. Hamilton (D)
 . Edward Hammond (D)
 . Thomas Yates Walsh (W)
 . Alexander Evans (W)
 . Joseph S. Cottman (IW)

Massachusetts 
 . William Appleton (W)
 . Robert Rantoul Jr. (D), until August 7, 1852
 Francis B. Fay (W), from December 13, 1852
 . James H. Duncan (W)
 . Benjamin Thompson (W), until September 24, 1852
 Lorenzo Sabine (W), from December 13, 1852
 . Charles Allen (FS)
 . George T. Davis (W)
 . John Z. Goodrich (W)
 . Horace Mann (FS)
 . Orin Fowler (W), until September 3, 1852
 Edward P. Little (D), from December 13, 1852
 . Zeno Scudder (W)

Michigan 
 . Ebenezer J. Penniman (W)
 . Charles E. Stuart (D)
 . James L. Conger (W)

Mississippi 
 . Benjamin D. Nabers (U)
 . John A. Wilcox (U)
 . John D. Freeman (U)
 . Albert G. Brown (SR)

Missouri 
 . John F. Darby (W)
 . Gilchrist Porter (W)
 . John G. Miller (W)
 . Willard P. Hall (D)
 . John S. Phelps (D)

New Hampshire 
 . Amos Tuck (W)
 . Charles H. Peaslee (D)
 . Jared Perkins (W)
 . Harry Hibbard (D)

New Jersey 
 . Nathan T. Stratton (D)
 . Charles Skelton (D)
 . Isaac Wildrick (D)
 . George H. Brown (W)
 . Rodman M. Price (D)

New York 
 . John G. Floyd (D)
 . Obadiah Bowne (W)
 . Emanuel B. Hart (D)
 . John Haws (W)
 . George Briggs (W)
 . James Brooks (W)
 . Abraham P. Stephens (D)
 . Gilbert Dean (D)
 . William Murray (D)
 . Marius Schoonmaker (W)
 . Josiah Sutherland (D)
 . David L. Seymour (D)
 . John L. Schoolcraft (W)
 . John H. Boyd (W)
 . Joseph Russell (D)
 . John Wells (W)
 . Alexander H. Buell (D), until January 29, 1853
 . Preston King (D)
 . Willard Ives (D)
 . Timothy Jenkins (D)
 . William W. Snow (D)
 . Henry Bennett (W)
 . Leander Babcock (D)
 . Daniel T. Jones (D)
 . Thomas Y. Howe Jr. (D)
 . Henry S. Walbridge (W)
 . William A. Sackett (W)
 . Abraham M. Schermerhorn (W)
 . Jerediah Horsford (W)
 . Reuben Robie (D)
 . Frederick S. Martin (W)
 . Solomon G. Haven (W)
 . Augustus P. Hascall (W)
 . Lorenzo Burrows (W)

North Carolina 
 . Thomas L. Clingman (W)
 . Joseph P. Caldwell (W)
 . Alfred Dockery (W)
 . James T. Morehead (W)
 . Abraham W. Venable (D)
 . John R. J. Daniel (D)
 . William S. Ashe (D)
 . Edward Stanly (W)
 . David Outlaw (W)

Ohio 
 . David T. Disney (D)
 . Lewis D. Campbell (W)
 . Hiram Bell (W)
 . Benjamin Stanton (W)
 . Alfred P. Edgerton (D)
 . Frederick W. Green (D)
 . Nelson Barrere (W)
 . John L. Taylor (W)
 . Edson B. Olds (D)
 . Charles Sweetser (D)
 . George H. Busby (D)
 . John Welch (W)
 . James M. Gaylord (D)
 . Alexander Harper (W)
 . William F. Hunter (W)
 . John Johnson (ID)
 . Joseph Cable (D)
 . David K. Cartter (D)
 . Eben Newton (W)
 . Joshua R. Giddings (FS)
 . Norton S. Townshend (D)

Pennsylvania 
 . Thomas B. Florence (D)
 . Joseph R. Chandler (W)
 . Henry D. Moore (W)
 . John Robbins Jr. (D)
 . John McNair (D)
 . Thomas Ross (D)
 . John A. Morrison (D)
 . Thaddeus Stevens (W)
 . J. Glancey Jones (D)
 . Milo M. Dimmick (D)
 . Henry M. Fuller (W)
 . Galusha A. Grow (D)
 . James Gamble (D)
 . Thomas M. Bibighaus (W)
 . William H. Kurtz (D)
 . James X. McLanahan (D)
 . Andrew Parker (D)
 . John L. Dawson (D)
 . Joseph H. Kuhns (W)
 . John Allison (W)
 . Thomas M. Howe (W)
 . John W. Howe (W)
 . Carlton B. Curtis (D)
 . Alfred Gilmore (D)

Rhode Island 
 . George G. King (W)
 . Benjamin B. Thurston (D)

South Carolina 
 . Daniel Wallace (D)
 . James L. Orr (D)
 . Joseph A. Woodward (D)
 . John McQueen (D)
 . Armistead Burt (D)
 . William Aiken Jr. (D)
 . William F. Colcock (D)

Tennessee 
 . Andrew Johnson (D)
 . Albert G. Watkins (W)
 . William M. Churchwell (D)
 . John H. Savage (D)
 . George W.Jones (D)
 . William H. Polk (ID)
 . Meredith P. Gentry (W)
 . William Cullom (W)
 . Isham G. Harris (D)
 . Frederick P. Stanton (D)
 . Christopher H. Williams (W)

Texas 
 . Richardson A. Scurry (D)
 . Volney E. Howard (D)

Vermont 
 . Ahiman L. Miner (W)
 . William Hebard (W)
 . James Meacham (W)
 . Thomas Bartlett Jr. (D)

Virginia 
 . John S. Millson (D)
 . Richard K. Meade (D)
 . Thomas H. Averett (D)
 . Thomas S. Bocock (D)
 . Paulus Powell (D)
 . John Caskie (D)
 . Thomas H. Bayly (D)
 . Alexander Holladay (D)
 . James F. Strother (W)
 . Charles J. Faulkner (W)
 . John Letcher (D)
 . Henry A. Edmundson (D)
 . LaFayette McMullen (D)
 . James M. H. Beale (D)
 . George W. Thompson (D), until July 30, 1852
 Sherrard Clemens (D), from December 6, 1852

Wisconsin 
 . Charles Durkee (FS)
 . Ben C. Eastman (D)
 . James D. Doty (ID)

Non-voting members
 . Henry H. Sibley
 . Richard H. Weightman (D)
 . Joseph Lane (D)
 . John M. Bernhisel

Changes in membership 

The count below reflects changes from the beginning of the first session of this Congress.

Senate 
 Replacements: 8
 Democrats (D): 1 seat net gain
 Whigs (W): 1 seat net loss
 Deaths: 3
 Resignations: 6
 Interim appointments: 3
Total seats with changes: 13

|-
| Ohio(1)
| Vacant
| Failure to elect.The winner was elected late on March 15, 1851, on the 37th ballot over the incumbent appointee.Successor was elected March 15, 1851.
|  | Benjamin Wade (W)
| Elected March 15, 1851

|-
| New York(1)
| Vacant
| Failure to elect.Successor was elected March 19, 1851.
|  | Hamilton Fish (W)
| Elected March 19, 1851

|-
| Massachusetts(1)
| Vacant
| Failure to elect.Successor was elected April 24, 1851.
|  | Charles Sumner (FS)
| Elected April 24, 1851

|-
| California(1)
| Vacant
| Failure to elect.Successor was elected January 30, 1852.
|  | John B. Weller (D)
| Elected January 30, 1852

|-
| Connecticut(1)
| Vacant
| Failure to elect.Successor was elected May 12, 1852.
|  | Isaac Toucey (D)
| Seated May 12, 1852

|-
| Mississippi(1)
|  | Jefferson Davis (D)
| Resigned September 23, 1851, to run for Governor of Mississippi.Successor appointed December 1, 1851.
|  | John J. McRae (D)
| Appointed December 1, 1851

|-
| Mississippi(2)
|  | Henry S. Foote (D)
| Resigned January 8, 1852, to become Governor of Mississippi.Successor elected February 18, 1852.
|  | Walker Brooke (W)
| Elected February 18, 1852

|-
| Mississippi(1)
|  | John J. McRae (D)
| Appointee was replaced by an elected successor.Successor elected March 17, 1852.
|  | Stephen Adams (D)
| Elected March 17, 1852

|-
| South Carolina(2)
|  | Robert Rhett (D)
| Resigned May 7, 1852.Successor appointed May 10, 1852, and elected sometime thereafter to finish the term.
|  | William F. De Saussure (D)
| Appointed May 10, 1852

|-
| Georgia(2)
|  | John M. Berrien (W)
| Resigned May 28, 1852.Successor appointed May 31, 1852, to finish the term.
|  | Robert M. Charlton (D)
| Appointed May 31, 1852

|-
| Kentucky(3)
|  | Henry Clay (W)
| Died June 29, 1852.Successor appointed July 6, 1852.
|  | David Meriwether (D)
| Appointed July 6, 1852

|-
| Indiana(3)
|  | James Whitcomb (D)
| Died October 4, 1852.Successor appointed December 6, 1852.
|  | Charles W. Cathcart (D)
| Appointed December 6, 1852

|-
| Kentucky(3)
|  | David Meriwether (D)
| Appointee was replaced by an elected successor.Successor elected September 1, 1852.
|  | Archibald Dixon (W)
| Elected September 1, 1852

|-
| Alabama(3)
|  | William R. King (D)
| Resigned December 20, 1852, due to ill health, having recently being elected Vice President of the United StatesSuccessor appointed January 14, 1853, and elected December 12, 1853 thereafter to finish the term.
|  | Benjamin Fitzpatrick (D)
| Appointed January 14, 1853

|-
| New Jersey(1)
|  | Robert F. Stockton (D)
| Resigned January 1, 1853, to become president of the Delaware and Raritan Canal Company.Successor was not elected until the next Congress.
| Vacant
| Not filled this term

|-
| Vermont(3)
|  | William Upham (W)
| Died January 14, 1853.Successor appointed January 17, 1853, to continue the term.
|  | Samuel S. Phelps (W)
| Appointed January 17, 1853

|-
| Indiana(3)
|  | Charles W. Cathcart (D)
| Appointee was replaced by an elected successor.Successor elected January 18, 1853.
|  | John Pettit (D)
| Elected January 18, 1853
|}

House of Representatives 
 Replacements: 6
 Democrats (D): 1 seat net loss
 Whigs (W): 1 seat net gain
 Deaths: 2
 Resignations: 5
Total seats with changes: 7

|-
| 
|  | Charles Andrews (D)
| Died April 30, 1852
|  | Isaac Reed (W)
| Seated June 25, 1852
|-
| 
|  | George W. Thompson (D)
| Resigned July 30, 1852, after being appointed judge of the Circuit Court of Virginia
|  | Sherrard Clemens (D)
| Seated December 6, 1852
|-
| 
|  | Humphrey Marshall (W)
| Resigned August 4, 1852, after being appointed Minister to China
|  | William Preston (W)
| Seated December 6, 1852
|-
| 
|  | Robert Rantoul Jr. (D)
| Died August 7, 1852
|  | Francis B. Fay (W)
| Seated December 13, 1852
|-
| 
|  | Orin Fowler (W)
| Died September 3, 1852
|  | Edward P. Little (D)
| Seated December 13, 1852
|-
| 
|  | Benjamin Thompson (W)
| Died September 24, 1852
|  | Lorenzo Sabine (W)
| Seated December 13, 1852
|-
| 
|  | Alexander H. Buell (D)
| Died January 29, 1853
| Vacant
| Not filled this term
|}

Committees 
Lists of committees and their party leaders.

Senate
 Agriculture (Chairman: Pierre Soule)
 Audit and Control the Contingent Expenses of the Senate (Chairman: Augustus Dodge)
 Claims (Chairman: Richard Brodhead)
 Commerce (Chairman: Hannibal Hamlin)
 Contested Election of 1850 (Chairman: N/A)
 Distributing Public Revenue Among the States (Select)
 District of Columbia (Chairman: James Shields)
 Emigrant Route and Telegraphic Line to California (Select)
 Ether Discovery (Select)
 Finance (Chairman: Robert M.T. Hunter)
 Foreign Relations (Chairman: James M. Mason)
 French Spoilations (Select)
 Indian Affairs (Chairman: David R. Atchison)
 Judiciary (Chairman: Andrew P. Butler)
 Manufactures (Chairman: William K. Sebastian)
 Library (Chairman: James A. Pearce)
 Mexican Boundary (Select)
 Mexican Boundary Commission (Select)
 Mexican Claims Commission (Select)
 Military Affairs (Chairman: James Shields)
 Militia (Chairman: Sam Houston)
 Naval Affairs (Chairman: William M. Gwin)
 Ordnance and War Ships (Select)
 Patents and the Patent Office (Chairman: Moses Norris Jr. and Charles T. James)
 Pensions (Chairman: George Wallace Jones)
 Post Office and Post Roads (Chairman: Thomas J. Rusk)
 Printing (Chairman: Hannibal Hamlin)
 Private Land Claims (Chairman: Solomon W. Downs)
 Public Buildings and Grounds (Chairman: James Whitcomb)
 Public Lands (Chairman: Alpheus Felch)
 Purchase of Catlin's Collection of Indian Scenes (Select)
 Retrenchment (Chairman: James W. Bradbury)
 Revolutionary Claims (Chairman: Issac P. Walker)
 Roads and Canals (Chairman: Jesse D. Bright) 
 Tariff Regulation (Select)
 Territories (Chairman: Stephen A. Douglas)
 Seventh Census (Select)
 Whole

House of Representatives
 Accounts (Chairman: John C. Mason)
 Agriculture (Chairman: John G. Floyd)
 Bounty Land Act of 1850 (Select)
 Bounty Land Bill (Chairman: Cyrus L. Dunham)
 Claims (Chairman: John Reeves Jones Daniel)
 Commerce (Chairman: David L. Seymour)
 District of Columbia (Chairman: Orlando B. Ficklin)
 Elections (Chairman: William S. Ashe)
 Engraving (Chairman: Edward Hammond)
 Expenditures in the Navy Department (Chairman: Fayette McMullen)
 Expenditures in the Post Office Department (Chairman: Alexander G. Penn)
 Expenditures in the State Department (Chairman: Charles E. Stuart)
 Expenditures in the Treasury Department (Chairman: Benjamin B. Thurston)
 Expenditures in the War Department (Chairman: Milo M. Dimmick)
 Expenditures on Public Buildings (Chairman: Thomas Bartlett Jr.)
 Foreign Affairs (Chairman: Thomas H. Bayly)
 Indian Affairs (Chairman: Robert W. Johnson)
 Invalid Pensions (Chairman: Isham G. Harris)
 Judiciary (Chairman: James X. McLanahan) 
 Manufactures (Chairman: James M.H. Beale)
 Mileage (Chairman: Thomas A. Hendricks)
 Military Affairs (Chairman: William H. Bissell)
 Militia (Chairman: Charles H. Peaslee)
 Naval Affairs (Chairman: Frederick P. Stanton)
 Patents (Chairman: David K. Cartter)
 Post Office and Post Roads (Chairman: Edson B. Olds)
 Private Land Claims (Chairman: Timothy Jenkins)
 Public Buildings and Grounds (Chairman: Richard H. Stanton)
 Public Expenditures (Chairman: Charles Sweetser)
 Public Lands (Chairman: Willard P. Hall)
 Revisal and Unfinished Business (Chairman: Williamson R. W. Cobb)
 Revolutionary Claims (Chairman: Moses Macdonald)
 Revolutionary Pensions (Chairman: John S. Millson)
 Roads and Canals (Chairman: John L. Robinson)
 Rules (Chairman: Willard P. Hall)
 Standards of Official Conduct
 Territories (Chairman: William A. Richardson)
 Ways and Means (Chairman: George S. Houston)
 Whole

Joint committees
 Enrolled Bills (Chairman: Rep. Isaac Wildrick)
 The Library (Chairman: Joseph R. Chandler)
 Printing (Chairman: Willis A. Gorman)

Caucuses 
 Senate Democratic Caucus
 House Democratic Caucus

Employees

Legislative branch agency directors 
 Architect of the Capitol: Thomas U. Walter, appointed June 11, 1851
 Librarian of Congress: John Silva Meehan

Senate 
 Chaplain: Clement M. Butler (Episcopalian)
 Secretary: Asbury Dickins
 Sergeant at Arms: Robert Beale

House of Representatives 
 Chaplain: Ralph Randolph Gurley (Presbyterian), until December 1, 1851
 Lyttleton Morgan (Methodist''), elected December 1, 1851
 James Gallagher (Presbyterian), elected December 6, 1852
 Clerk: Richard M. Young, until December 1, 1851
 John W. Forney, from December 1, 1851
 Doorkeeper: Zadock W. McKnew
 Reading Clerks: 
 Sergeant at Arms: Adam J. Glossbrenner
 Postmaster: John M. Johnson

See also 

 1850 United States elections (elections leading to this Congress)
 1850–51 United States Senate elections
 1850–51 United States House of Representatives elections
 1852 United States elections (elections during this Congress, leading to the next Congress)
 1852 United States presidential election
 1852–53 United States Senate elections
 1852–53 United States House of Representatives elections

Notes

References

External links 

 Statutes at Large, 1789-1875
 Senate Journal, First Forty-three Sessions of Congress
 House Journal, First Forty-three Sessions of Congress
 Biographical Directory of the U.S. Congress
 U.S. House of Representatives: House History
 U.S. Senate: Statistics and Lists